Kestert (formerly Kester) is a municipality in the district of Rhein-Lahn, in Rhineland-Palatinate, in western Germany.

References

External links
Painting of Kester, J.F. Dielmann, A. Fay, J. Becker (painter): F.C. Vogels Panorama des Rheins, Bilder des rechten und linken Rheinufers, Lithographische Anstalt F.C. Vogel, Frankfurt 1833
Painting 2 of Kester, dito
Painting 3 of Kester, dito

Municipalities in Rhineland-Palatinate
Rhein-Lahn-Kreis